The third season of Lois & Clark: The New Adventures of Superman originally aired between September 17, 1995 and May 12, 1996, beginning with "We Have a Lot to Talk About".

The series loosely follows the comic philosophy of writer John Byrne, with Clark Kent as the true personality, and Superman as a secondary disguise. As the show's title suggests, it focuses as much on the relationship between Clark Kent and Lois Lane on the adventures of Clark's alter-ego. The central characters in season 3 are Dean Cain as Clark Kent/Superman, Teri Hatcher as Lois Lane, Lane Smith as Perry White, Eddie Jones as Jonathan Kent, K Callan as Martha Kent, and Justin Whalin as Jimmy Olsen.

Season three would go on to be the most successful season of Lois & Clark in its run. The show averaged more than 18 million viewers per episode, and ranked 44th for the season. In the premiere episode, Lois revealed that she had recently learned Clark's secret identity. Only later in the seventh episode of the season, "Ultra Woman", did Lois finally accept Clark's proposal. The long-anticipated wedding was put off to coincide with the characters' marriage in the comics, which led to many storylines designed to delay and interrupt the wedding on the TV series.

Another controversy erupted when ABC announced that the wedding would actually take place Valentine's Day weekend, even sending out heart-shaped "wedding invitations" to ABC News staff, only to present viewers with a bogus wedding, in which Clark unwittingly married a clone of Lois who was developed by a mad scientist whose creations are required to ingest frogs periodically as nourishment. This started a special five-part story, with Lois being kidnapped by Lex Luthor who had put the clone in her place and later with Lois suffering amnesia after a sharp hit on the head and needing to regain her memory.

The wedding of Lois and Clark was scheduled and prepared by DC's Superman comics team for release during what would have worked out to be the third season of Lois and Clark. The ongoing Superman comics are not affiliated with television or movies and move in their own direction at their own pace. When the comic book wedding became known to the producers of the Lois and Clark television series, they asked the DC Comics team to postpone the wedding issue as they were planning to marry Lois and Clark in their fourth season and it would help them if the comic book wedding were to coincide with their television program. The DC comics team agreed to postpone their wedding issue.

Episodes

See also 

 List of Lois & Clark: The New Adventures of Superman episodes

References

External links 
 Season 3 at the Internet Movie Database

1995 American television seasons
1996 American television seasons
Lois & Clark: The New Adventures of Superman seasons